Yuma Union High School District (YUHSD) is a high school district headquartered in Yuma, Arizona.

Feeder elementary school districts include Crane Elementary School District, Gadsden Elementary School District, Somerton Elementary School District, and Yuma Elementary School District.

In April 2017, the district offices moved into Yuma High School's Old Main building, as the district headquarters will be reconstructed on Avenue A and 32nd street.

Schools

References

External links 
 Yuma Union High School District

Yuma, Arizona
School districts in Yuma County, Arizona
1909 establishments in Arizona Territory
School districts established in 1909